Benjamin Azamati-Kwaku (born 14 January 1998) is a Ghanaian sprinter, who currently competes for ASICS Global. 

He made history by breaking a 22-year national record held by Leo Myles Mills on 26 March 2021 in Texas by clocking 9.97 seconds to qualify him for the Tokyo Summer Olympics. 

Mustafa Ussif, the Sports Minister and Dr Bella Bello Bitugu, the Director of the University of Ghana Sports Directorate, congratulated Benjamin Azamati on the national feat.

Early life and education 

Azamati was born on 14 January 1998 to John and Faustina Azamati in Akim oda, Ghana.

His preferred sport growing up was football, but transitioned to athletics while attending Presbyterian Boys' Senior High School in Accra where his running talent was discovered by his PE masters (Nathaniel Botchway, Gideon Dukplah and Kofi Dadzie).

Occupation and honors 
As a 21-year old he emerged as an Olympic hopeful for Ghana in the sprints after running 100 metres in 10.02 seconds HT at the 2019 Ghana's Fastest Human competition.
He won a gold medal in the 4x100m relay at the 2019 African Games in Rabat. He won the GUSA 100m on two occasions.

In 2021, he improved the 100m national record with 9.97 and improved his 200m personal best to 20.13.

On 25 March 2022, Azamati improved his own 100m national record to an early world lead of 9.90 seconds in Texas, USA, making him the joint 4th fastest collegiate of all-time with Trayvon Bromell.  This mark also placed him within the top 50 all-time 100m sprint performances with only 6 Africans running faster in the continent at the time.

Personal bests

Outdoor 

 100 metres - 9.90 (+2.0 m/s, Texas 2022)
 200 metres - 20.13 (+1.1 m/s, Texas 2021)

Indoor 

 60 metres - 6.54 ( Albuquerque 2022)
 200 metres - 20.57 (Texas 2022)

Achievements

International championships

References

External links
 

1998 births
Living people
Ghanaian male sprinters
Place of birth missing (living people)
Athletes (track and field) at the 2019 African Games
Competitors at the 2019 Summer Universiade
Athletes (track and field) at the 2020 Summer Olympics
Olympic athletes of Ghana
Presbyterian Boys' Senior High School alumni
African Games competitors for Ghana
African Games medalists in athletics (track and field)
African Games gold medalists for Ghana
Athletes (track and field) at the 2022 Commonwealth Games
Ghanaian sportspeople